Kwik  is a village in the administrative district of Gmina Pisz, within Pisz County, Warmian-Masurian Voivodeship, in northern Poland. It is located on Lake Białoławki in the region of Masuria.

The village has an approximate population of 130.

History
The village was founded in the 15th century. In the late 19th century, it had an entirely Polish population of 304, which was mostly employed in agriculture, fishing and fish trade.

References

Villages in Pisz County
Populated lakeshore places in Poland
Populated places established in the 15th century